Title 5 of the United States Code is a positive law title of the United States Code with the heading "Government Organization And Employees."

Provisions
Title 5 contains the Freedom of Information Act, Privacy Act of 1974, the Congressional Review Act as well as authorization for government reorganizations such as Reorganization Plan No. 3.  It also is the Title that specifies Federal holidays.

 Part I: The Agencies Generally
 Part II: Civil Service Functions and Responsibilities
 Part III: Employees
 —Executive Schedule
 —General Schedule
 —Work Hours
 —Holidays

In addition, there is an appendix to Title 5 but it is not itself considered positive law.  It contains reorganization plans and the Inspector General Act of 1978, as well as other laws.

History
On September 6, 1966, Title 5 was enacted as positive law by Pub. L. 89–554. Prior to the 1966 positive law recodification, Title 5 had the heading, "Executive Departments and Government Officers and Employees."

References

External links

 U.S. Code Title 5, via United States Government Printing Office
 U.S. Code Title 5, via Cornell University

Title 05
05